Kazue (written: 一恵, 一枝, 和恵, 和枝, 和永, 良恵 or かずえ in hiragana) is a feminine Japanese given name. Notable people with the name include:

, Japanese actress
, Japanese gymnast
, Japanese swimmer
, Japanese voice actress
, Japanese weightlifter
, Japanese softball player
, Japanese actress
, Japanese manga artist
, Japanese swimmer
, Japanese voice actress
, Japanese professional wrestler
, Japanese judoka
, Japanese musician
, Japanese voice actress

Japanese feminine given names